The Rossville Historic District in Rossville in Fayette County, Tennessee was listed on the National Register of Historic Places in 2001.

The district runs roughly along Main St. (now Church St., per Google maps), Second St., and Front St. in Rossville, and includes Greek Revival, Colonial Revival, Queen Anne, Gothic Revival, and Craftsman architecture, as well as one or more I-houses and a number of one- and two-part commercial buildings.

Selected properties include:
30 Front St. (c.1910). Two-story four-square.
Morrison's Store / Rossville Grocery Market (c.1938), 60 Front Street.  One-story brick commercial building with a stepped parapet with tile coping, which originally was two separate buildings. 
Rossville Bank (c.1953), 70 Front Street. One-story Art Deco with brick veneer and a cast stone stepped parapet.
250 Main St. (c.1887). Two-story Queen Anne, with a wrap-around porch with paired round Tuscan columns on stone piers, and with Colonial Revival detailing.  Built by/for a woman, P.C. Stone, whose grandfather and another added its second story.
255 Main St. (c.1890). One story L-shaped building with Colonial Revival detailing.
270 Main St. (c.1890). One-and-a-half-story Queen Anne cottage.

A walking tour of the historic district is offered annually by a local, private group in Rossville.

See also
National Register of Historic Places listings in Fayette County, Tennessee

References

External links

Historic districts on the National Register of Historic Places in Tennessee
National Register of Historic Places in Fayette County, Tennessee